The 2022 Tour of Oman was a road cycling stage race that took place between 10 and 15 February 2022 in Oman. The race was rated as a category 2.Pro event on the 2022 UCI ProSeries calendar, and was the 11th edition of the Tour of Oman.

The race returned after a two-year hiatus and made its inaugural appearance in the UCI ProSeries. The 2020 edition was cancelled due to a national mourning period following the death of Sultan Qaboos bin Said, while the 2021 edition was cancelled due to the COVID-19 pandemic.

Teams 
Seven of the 18 UCI WorldTeams, eight UCI ProTeams, one UCI Continental team, and the Omani national team made up the 18 teams that participated in the race. Only six teams entered a full squad of seven riders each; five teams entered six riders each, while the remaining six teams entered five riders each. With one non-starter each,  was reduced to six riders, while  was reduced to four. In total, 100 riders started the race, of which 86 finished.

UCI WorldTeams

 
 
 
 
 
 
 

UCI ProTeams

 
 
 
 
 
 
 
 

UCI Continental Teams

 

National Teams

 Oman

Route

Stages

Stage 1 
10 February 2022 — Al Rustaq Fort to Oman Convention and Exhibition Centre,

Stage 2 
11 February 2022 — Naseem Park to Suhar Corniche,

Stage 3 
12 February 2022 — Sultan Qaboos University to Qurayyat,

Stage 4 
13 February 2022 — Al Sifah to Muscat Royal Opera,

Stage 5 
14 February 2022 — Samail (Al Feyhaa Resthouse) to Jabal al Akhdhar (Green Mountain),

Stage 6 
15 February 2022 — Al Mouj Muscat to Matrah Corniche,

Classification leadership table 

 On stage 2, Mark Cavendish, who was second in the points classification, wore the green jersey, because first-placed Fernando Gaviria wore the red jersey as the leader of the general classification. On stage 3, Gaviria wore the green jersey in place of Cavendish, who took over the lead in both classifications.
 On stage 4, Denis Nekrasov, who was second in the young rider classification, wore the white jersey, because first-placed Anthon Charmig wore the red jersey as the leader of the general classification.
 On stage 6, Fausto Masnada, who was second in the points classification, wore the green jersey, because first-placed Jan Hirt wore the red jersey as the leader of the general classification.

Final classification standings

General classification

Points classification

Aggressive rider classification

Young rider classification

Team classification

References

External links 
 

2022
Tour of Oman
Tour of Oman
Tour of Oman